Rzeszów Voivodeship can refer to one of two political entities in Poland:

Rzeszów Voivodeship (1) was a unit of administrative division and local government from 1975 to 1998, superseded by Podkarpackie Voivodeship. Major cities and towns included (population in 1995 in brackets):
 Its capital city, Rzeszów (160,300)
 Mielec (64,400),
 Łańcut (18.000).

Rzeszów Voivodeship (2) was a unit of administrative division and local government in Poland from 1945 to 1975, superseded by Rzeszów (1), Przemyśl, Krosno and parts of Tarnów and Tarnobrzeg voivodeships. Its creation was the result of change of Polish borders in 1945. Traditional center of this part of the country, Lwów, became annexed by the Soviet Union. Due to this fact, Polish government had to come up with a new city, which would have taken the role of Lwów. As Przemyśl, which was the second biggest city of the area (after Lwów), is located too close to the border, the new capital was organized in Rzeszów, a city in 1945 much smaller than Przemyśl.

See also
 Voivodeships of Poland

Former voivodeships of Poland (1945–1975)
Former voivodeships of Poland (1975–1998)
History of Podkarpackie Voivodeship